Charles Frederick Nielson (6 February 1871 – 15 August 1924) was a solicitor, and member of both the Queensland Legislative Council and Queensland Legislative Assembly.

Early years
Nielson was born at Schleswig, Germany, to Peter Nielson and his wife, Magdalena (née Fredericksen). He started his schooling in Hamburg before his family migrated to Australia and he continued his education in Bundaberg and at Maryborough Grammar School before commencing practice as a solicitor.

Business career
He was a partner in Hamilton and Nielson, Solicitors, and a director of several companies including the Bundaberg Foundry Co., the Blair Athol Coal and Timber Co., the Bundaberg Newspaper Co., and the Yeppoon Plantation Estate Co. Ltd.

Political career
Representing the Labour Party, Nielson contested the seat of Musgrave at the 1902 state election, losing to the Ministerialist candidate, William O'Connell. After O'Connell died in 1903, Nielson contested the subsequent by-election, this time losing to the Opposition candidate, John White.

Nielson's third attempt at winning Musgrave came at the 1904 state election, this time defeating White. He held the seat for three years before White regained it at the 1907 state election. In September of that year, he was appointed by the Kidston Ministry to the Legislative Council and remained a member till the Council was abolished in March 1922.

Personal life
Nielson married Ellen Horniblow in 1898 and together they had three sons. He died at Gympie in 1924 and was buried in the Bundaberg Cemetery.

References

Members of the Queensland Legislative Council
1871 births
1924 deaths
Members of the Queensland Legislative Assembly
Australian Labor Party members of the Parliament of Queensland
People from Schleswig, Schleswig-Holstein